Tchaourou (Saworo in Yoruba etymology, meaning rattle) is a commune, arrondissement, and city located in the Borgou Department of Benin, a country in Western Africa, formerly known as Dahomey (until 1975). It is the birthplace of former Beninese president Yayi Boni.

Overview

Climate

Demographics

The main languages of Tchaourou are Bariba, Fula, Yoruba, Otamari and Yom Lokpa.

Administration
The commune is divided administratively into 7 arrondissements, in 5 quarters and 31 villages.

References

Communes of Benin
Populated places in Benin
Communes in Yorubaland